The women's 1500 metres event at the 1983 Summer Universiade was held at the Commonwealth Stadium in Edmonton, Canada, on 10 and 11 July 1983.

Medalists

Results

Heats

Final

References

Athletics at the 1983 Summer Universiade
1983